Haydar Khan Zanganeh was a Zand official of Kurdish origin. He belonged to the Zanganeh tribe, a Sunni Kurdish tribe native to Kermanshah. He served in high-offices under the Zand ruler Karim Khan (r. 1751-1779), and was twice sent as a diplomat to the important Ottoman city of Baghdad.

Sources
 

Iranian Kurdish people
People from Kermanshah
18th-century Iranian politicians
Zanganeh
Zand diplomats
Zand civil servants